Bachar Village is a village in Udaipur district in the Indian state of Rajasthan. As per Population Census 2011, the total population of Bachar is 1820, literacy rate of Bachar Village was 34.7 % which is very low compared to 66.11 % of Rajasthan.

Education 
Bachar is nearby to deemed and private school and colleges which includes Geetanjali College Of Pharmaceutical Studies and Advent Institute Of Management Studies.

References 

Villages in Udaipur district